Armenaki  or Άρμενακι(el) is an anonymous Greek folkloric tune (syrtos or sousta).

Original form
The original Greek form of the syrtos is a popular folk dance in Greece (Cyclades). It is widespread as a Nisiotika music tune, all over the world.

Βranches of tune
There are modern popular versions of this song, with English lyrics, known as "Far Away", one sung by Demis Roussos. There are modern popular versions of this song, with Turkish lyrics, known as "Gözünaydın", one sung by Ajda Pekkan.

See also
Lygaria

References

Greek songs
Domna Samiou songs
Year of song unknown
Songwriter unknown